Atractaspis scorteccii, commonly known as Scortecci's mole viper or the Somali burrowing asp, is a species of venomous snake in the family Atractaspididae.

Etymology
The specific epithet, scorteccii, is in honor of Italian herpetologist Giuseppe Scortecci (1898–1973).

Geographic range
A. scorteccii is endemic to Africa, where it is found in Ethiopia and Somalia.

Reproduction
A. scorteccii is oviparous.

References

Further reading
Parker HW (1949). "The Snakes of Somaliland and the Sokotra Islands". Zoologische Verhandlingen 6: 1–115. (Atractaspis scorteccii, new species, p. 109).

Atractaspididae
Reptiles described in 1949